Qaleh-ye Sangi (also Romanized as Qal‘eh-ye Sangī; also known as Qal‘eh Sang) is a village in Dasht-e Zarrin Rural District, in the Central District of Kuhrang County, Chaharmahal and Bakhtiari Province, Iran. At the 2006 census, its population was 135, in 25 families.

References 

Populated places in Kuhrang County